KIV could refer to:

 Chişinău International Airport, Moldova; IATA airport code KIV.
 Kiveton Bridge railway station, England; National Rail station code KIV.